Tołkiny  (later Tolksdorf) is a village in the administrative district of Gmina Korsze, within Kętrzyn County, Warmian-Masurian Voivodeship, in northern Poland. According to the findings of German genealogists, the Tolkien family probably comes from Tołkiny.

Notable residents
 Heinrich Graf zu Dohna-Schlobitten (1882-1944), German general and resistance fighter

References

Villages in Kętrzyn County